

Real estate

 Ben Ashkenazy (1968/69–), Israeli-American developer, founder of the Ashkenazy Acquisition Corporation
 Sol Atlas (1907–1973), Long Island real estate developer responsible for the Miracle Mile 
 Gary Barnett (1956–), founder of the Extell Development Company (known for One57 a.k.a. "The Billionaire Building")
 Joseph Barry (1933–), co-founder of the New Jersey-focused Applied Housing Company and the Hudson Reporter newspaper chain
 Jack Benaroya (1921–2012), developer, founder of the Benaroya Company
 Charles Benenson (1913–2004), former president of the Benenson Realty Co.
 Marshall Bennett (1915–2018), Chicago-based real estate developer, credited with developing the modern industrial park
 David Bistricer (1949–), Belgian-born founder of Clipper Equity
 Stanley Black (1932–), investor, founder of the Black Equities Group
 Neil Bluhm (1938–), Chicago-based real estate and casino magnate, co-founder of JMB Realty (Judelson-Malkin-Bluhm)
 Shaya Boymelgreen (1951–), Israeli-born developer
 Matthew Bucksbaum (1926–2013), co-founder of GGP Inc.
 Jack Buncher (1911–2001), Pittsburgh-based developer
 Morris Cafritz (1888–1964), Lithuanian-born developer
 Alan Casden (1945–), Los Angeles-based developer, founder of Casden Properties LLC 
 Joseph Cayre (1941–), founder of Midtown Equities, co-founder of GT Interactive (now Atari)
 Leon Charney (1938–2016), NYC real estate tycoon
 Stanley Chera (1942–2020), developer, founder of Crown Acquisitions
 Joseph Chetrit (1957–), Moroccan-born NYC-based developer, founder of the Chetrit Group 
 Charles S. Cohen (1952–), President and CEO of Cohen Brothers Realty Corporation
 Paul L. (1909–2003), David S. (1940–), and Reed Cordish (1974–), The Cordish Companies
 Michael Dezer (1941–), Miami-based Israeli-American developer, founder of Dezer Properties
 Sanford Diller (1928–2018), Bay Area developer
 Sherman Dreiseszun (1922–2007), Kansas City-based developer, co-founder of MD Management (known for One Kansas City Place)
 Louis Dubin (1963–), developer and investor, (co-)founder of the Athena Group and founding partner of Redbrick LMD
 Joseph (1882–1974), Seymour (1913–1995) and Douglas Durst (1944–), the Durst Organization; members of the Durst family
 Simon Dushinsky (1972–), Israeli-born developer, co-owner of the Rabsky Group 
 Solomon Dwek (1973–), New Jersey-based pyramid scheme real estate developer
 Sam Eig (1899–1982), Russian-born D.C.-based developer
 Henry Elghanayan (1940–), Iranian-born developer, co-founder of the Rockrose Development Corporation
 Jeffrey Feil (1947–), the Feil Organization
 Ziel Feldman, founder of real estate development and investment company HFZ Capital Group
 Irving Mitchell Felt (1910–1994), New York-based developer, known for the new Madison Square Garden
 John J. Fisher (1961–), majority owner of the Oakland Athletics; Gap Inc. heir
 Josh Flagg (1985–), Beverly Hills luxury real estate agent
 Alfred W. Fleisher (c. 1878–1928) was an American real estate investor and co-founder and head of Mastbaum Brothers & Fleisher
 Jay Furman (1942–2015), former president of RD Management LLC
 Russell W. Galbut (1952–), Miami-based developer, co-founder of Crescent Heights, Inc. 
 Malcolm Glazer (1928–2014), founder of L.A.-based real estate holding company First Allied Corp., former owner of EPL's Manchester United F.C. and NFL's Tampa Bay Buccaneers
 Laurence Gluck (1953–), landlord, founder of Stellar Management
 Sol Goldman (1917–1987), NYC's biggest non-institutional real estate investor in the 1980s, founder of Solil Management
 Yoel Goldman (1980–), founder of All Year Management, one of the most prominent developers in Brooklyn
 Jona Goldrich (1927–2016), Polish-born L.A.-based developer, co-founder of Goldrich & Kest Industries
 Stephen L. Green (1938–), founder of SL Green Realty
 Craig Greenberg, cofounder, president, and CEO of 21c Museum Hotels
 Jeff Greene (1954–), investor
 Harold Grinspoon (1929–), founder of Aspen Square Management and the Harold Grinspoon Foundation
 Stanley Gumberg (1927–2009), Pittsburgh-based developer and chairman of J.J. Gumberg Co.
Aaron Gural (1917–2009), chairman of Newmark & Company
 Kamran Hakim, Iranian-born NYC-based landlord, developer and founder of the Hakim Organization
 Judah Hertz (1948/1949–), real estate investor, founder of Hertz Investment Group
 Abraham (1919–2005) and Elie Hirschfeld (1949–), NYC-based developers
 Tibor Hollo (1927–), Hungarian-born Miami-based developer, founder of Florida East Coast Realty
 Douglas Jemal (1942–), developer and landlord, founder of the Douglas Development Corp. (owns the Seneca One Tower, Buffalo's tallest building), co-founder of electronic stores chain The Wiz (a.k.a. "Nobody Beats the Wiz")
 Peter S. Kalikow (1942–), president of HJ Kalikow & Co., one of New York City's leading real estate firms; former owner of the New York Post
 Sonny Kahn, Israeli-born Miami-based developer, co-founder of Crescent Heights, Inc.
 Louis S. Kahnweiler (1919–2017), former Chicago-based developer, co-founder of Bennett & Kahnweiler
 Stan Kasten (1952–), president and co-owner of MLB's Los Angeles Dodgers
 Saul Katz (1939–), co-founder of Sterling Equities, president of MLB's New York Mets
 Louis Kestenbaum (1952–), developer and founder of NYC-based Fortis Property Group
 Martin Kimmel (1916–2008), co-founder of the Kimco Realty Corporation 
 Alfred J. Koeppel (1932–2001), New York-based developer, founder of Koeppel Tener Real Estate Services
 George Konheim (1917–2001), former L.A.-based developer, founder of Buckeye Construction Co.
 Bob Kraft (1941–), Massachusetts-based real estate mogul, chairman of the Kraft Group, owner of NFL's New England Patriots and MLS's New England Revolution
 Charles Kushner (1954–), founder of Kushner Companies; member of the Kushner family
 Jared (1981–) and Joshua Kushner (1985–), co-founders of fintech company Cadre
 Albert Laboz, New Jersey-based landlord, founder of United American Land (UAL)
 Abraham E. Lefcourt (1876–1932), founder of the Lefcourt Group
 Richard LeFrak (1945–), developer and manager; one of the biggest landlords in the NY tri-state area; member of the LeFrak family
 Ted Lerner (1925–2023), founder of Lerner Enterprises
 William Levitt (1907–1994), developer, former president of Levitt & Sons, Inc. (known for Levittown, New York)
 Alan Leventhal (1952–), real estate investor, founder of Beacon Capital Partners
 Edward J. Lewis (1937–2006), Pittsburgh-based developer, founder of the Oxford Development Company
 David Lichtenstein (1960–), NYC-based developer, founder of the Lightstone Group
 Edward Linde (1941–2010), developer, co-founder of Boston Properties
 Leonard Litwin (1914–2017), developer, founder of Glenwood Management
 Abraham M. Lurie (1923–2010), Los Angeles-based developer, known for Marina del Rey, California
 Louis Lurie (1888–1972), San Francisco-based developer
 Harry B. Macklowe (1937–), NYC-based developer and investor, founder of Macklowe Properties (owns Manhattan's Metropolitan Tower, and 1 Wall Street)
 Amir, Eskandar and Fraydun Manocherian (1932–), Iranian-born NYC-based investors, founders of Manocherian Brothers and Pan Am Equities
 Bernard H. Mendik (1929–2001), Scottish-born founder of the Mendik Company and former chairman of the Real Estate Board of New York
 Howard Michaels (1955–2018), founder of the real estate investment advisory firm the Carlton Group
 Sam Miller (1921–2019), former CEO of Forest City Material Co. and later Forest City Enterprises
 Adam Milstein (1952–), Israeli-American real estate investor, managing partner at Hager Pacific Properties; co-founder of the Israeli-American Council
 Paul (1922–2010) and Seymour Milstein (1920–2001), NYC-based developers, founders of Milstein Properties, former owners of the Emigrant Savings Bank
 Henry H. Minskoff (1911–1984), New York-based developer
 Joseph Moinian (1954–), Iranian-born NYC-based developer, founder of the Moinian Group
 Irwin Molasky (1927–2020), Las Vegas-based developer
 Jerry J. Moore (1927–2008), Houston-based r/e developer who became the largest shopping center developer in the U.S. in the late 1980s
 Stephen Muss (1928–), Florida-based developer known for re-development of Miami Beach, Florida
 Fred Ohebshalom (1952–), Iranian-born NYC-based  developer, founder of Empire Management
 Jason Oppenheim (1977–), a real estate broker, attorney, influencer and reality TV personality.
 Geoffrey H. Palmer (1950–), L.A.-based developer
 Jordon Perlmutter (1931–2015), Denver-based developer, co-founder of Perl-Mack Enterprises
 Max Ratner (1907–1995), Polish-born co-founder of Forest City Enterprises; uncle of Brooklyn Nets co-owner Bruce Ratner
 Scott Rechler, Tri-State area landlord, founder of RXR Realty, LLC
 Jerry Reinsdorf (1936–), owner of NBA's Chicago Bulls and MLB's Chicago White Sox
 Craig Robins (1963–), Miami-based developer; known for re-developing the Miami Design District, co-owner of Design Miami
 Amy (1966–), Daniel (1929–), David (1892–1986), Elihu (1933–) and Frederick P. Rose (1923–1999), Rose Associates, Inc.; members of the Rose family
 Aby Rosen (1960–), German-born NYC real estate tycoon
 Stephen M. Ross (1940–), developer and landlord, founder of the Related Companies (known for Hudson Yards, Rosemary Square, Time Warner Center), owner of NFL's Miami Dolphins
 Steven Roth (1941–), founder of Vornado Realty Trust, chairman of JBG Smith
 Alexander Rovt (1952–), Ukrainian-born developer
 Arthur Rubloff (1902–1986), Chicago-based developer, founder of Arthur Rubloff & Co.
 Samuel Rudin (1896–1975), founder of the Rudin Management Company (later led by his sons, Jack (1924–2016) and Lewis (1927–2001))
 Naty Saidoff (1957–), Israeli-born Bel Air-based real estate investor and diamond dealer; founding member of the Israeli-American Council
 Fred Sands (1938–2015), LA-based developer
 Tamir Sapir (1946/1947–), Georgian-born NYC real estate mogul
 Felix Sater (1966–), Russian-American developer, former COO of the Bayrock Group
 Joel Schreiber, British-born NYC developer, founder of Waterbridge Capital, and early investor in WeWork
 Rubin Schron (1938–), NYC investor and landlord, founder of Cammeby's International Group
 Martin Selig (1936/1937–), German-born founder of Martin Selig Real Estate, LLC
 Melvin Floyd "Mel" Sembler (1930–), Florida-based retail real estate magnate
 Ben Shaoul (1977–), New York-based developer, co-founder of the Magnum Real Estate Group
 Izek Shomof (1959/1960–), Israeli-born Beverly Hills-based developer and investor; producer of For the Love of Money
 Michael Shvo (1972–), Israeli-American developer, founder of SHVO (acquired NYC's Crown Building)
 Stephen Siegel (1944–), Chairman of Global Brokerage at CBRE, the world's largest commercial real estate services company
 Walter Shorenstein (1915–2010), California real estate mogul
 Larry Silverstein (1931–), founder of Silverstein Properties; developed and owned the World Trade Center
 Herbert (1934–) and Melvin Simon (1926–2009), founders of the Simon Property Group, the largest shopping mall operator in the U.S., and owners of NBA's Indiana Pacers
 David Simon (1961/1962–), chairman and CEO of the Simon Property Group, former VP of Wasserstein Perella & Co.
 Robert E. Simon (1914–2015), real estate developer and founder of Reston, Virginia
 Baruch Singer (1954–), New York-based landlord, investor and developer
 Joseph Sitt (1964–), real estate investor, founder of Thor Equities and plus size women's clothing company Ashley Stewart, Inc.
 Charles Smith (1901–1995), Russian-born D.C.-based developer and founder of Charles E. Smith Co.; member of the Smith family
 Daniel Snyder (1964–), owner of NFL's Washington Commanders (previously known as the Washington Redskins)
 Donald Soffer (1932–), Florida-based developer, founder of Turnberry Associates; known for turning swampland into the city of Aventura, Florida; member of the Soffer family
 Joseph Soffer (1913–2006), Pittsburgh-based developer, founder of the Soffer Organization
 Sheldon Solow (1928–2020), NYC-based developer, founder of Solow Building Co.
 Jerry Speyer (1940–), co-founder of Tishman Speyer
 Bernard Spitzer (1924–2014), developer
 Bob Stark (1951–), Cleveland-based developer and founder of Stark Enterprises
 Axel Stawski (1950/1951–), German-born developer, founder of Stawski Partners
 A.J. Steigman (1985 - ) Florida-based founder of Steignet.com
 Donald Sterling (1934–), former owner of NBA's Los Angeles Clippers, owner of the Sterling Plaza 
 Michael Stern (1979–), New York-based developer, founder of the JDS Development Group
 Phillip Stollman (1906–1998), co-founder of Detroit-based Biltmore Development Company
 Louise Sunshine (1940–), Florida-based real estate professional, founder of the Sunshine Group
 Jeff Sutton (1960–), Brooklyn-based developer, founder of Wharton Properties
 Melvin Swig (1917–1993), San Francisco-based developer and former owner of NHL's California Golden Seals
 Stanley Tanger (1923–2010), founder of the Tanger Factory Outlet Centers
 Stanley G. Tate (1928–), Florida-based developer, founder of Tate Enterprises; founding member of the AIPAC
 A. Alfred Taubman (1924–2015), founder of Taubman Centers
 Steve Tisch (1949–), chairman/Executive Vice President of NFL's New York Giants
 Robert Tishman (1916–2010), former CEO of Tishman Realty & Construction, co-founder of Tishman Speyer; member of the Tishman family
 Robert I. (1940–2022) and Bruce E. Toll (1943–), founders of the luxury homebuilder company Toll Brothers, Inc.
 Leonard Tose (1915–2003), former owner of NFL's Philadelphia Eagles
 Harold (1905–1982) and Percy Uris (1899–1971), New York-based developers who founded the Uris Buildings Corporation
 Eli Verschleiser (1974–), NYC-based developer and investor, co-founder of the Multi Group of Companies and the United Realty Trust
 David Werner (1953/1954–), New York-based real estate investor and founder of David Werner Real Estate
 Leonard (1947–), Mark (1962–) and Zygi Wilf (1950–), developers; owners of NFL's Minnesota Vikings and co-owners of Major League Soccer's Nashville SC; members of the Wilf family
 Benjamin Winter (1881–1944), Polish-born NYC-based real estate investor and founder of Benjamin Winter, Inc.
 Lewis Wolff (1935–), developer and former owner of MLB's Oakland Athletics
 Bert Wolstein (1927–2004), former Cleveland-based developer, founder of the Developers Diversified Realty Corporation (now SITE Centers Corp.)
 William Zeckendorf, Sr. (1905–1976), developer, former owner of the Chrysler Building and Hotel Astor
 Samuel Zell (1941–), real estate mogul, founder of Equity Group Investments (EQ Office, Equity Residential)

See also
 Lists of Jewish Americans
 Businesspeople
 in finance
 in media
 in retail

References

American Jews
American real estate businesspeople
Jewish